The Korg Electribe R was released in 1999 as a dedicated electronic drum machine to complement the Korg Electribe A bass synthesizer. It features a 64 step sequencer and is MIDI-controllable. The sound is generated by digital signal processor circuits but can be manipulated in realtime (analog modeling synthesizer principle). A cross modulation function (replacing the previous ring modulation of the Mk I version) can be applied to percussion synthesizers 1 and 2 in the ER-1 Mk II version. The only other differences were new preset rhythm patterns and the metal casing. Because of the easy programming possibilities and competitive pricing the ER-1 quickly became popular among DJs and studio musicians. The overall sound character can be described as, although synthetic, similar to classic analog drum machines. However, the sound remains completely "tweakable" allowing realtime human variation and interaction, not unlike 4 simultaneous percussion synthesizers. In 2010, Korg released iElectribe R, a software version of the Electribe R for the iPad.In 2022 it was released for PC and Mac.

Korg Electribe R mkII Features 

 Analog modeling system plus PCM 
 Powerful Cross Modulation 
 Audio Input function 
 Step Sequencer 
 Motion Sequence function 
 Low Boost and Delay effects  
 Tap Tempo and MIDI Clock 
 4 synthesizer parts 
 4 PCM parts 
 2 audio-in parts 
 One accent part 
 256 patterns, 16 songs 
 Delay effects: Normal, Motion Sequence, Tempo Delay 
 Motion Sequences: synthesizer part-3 parameters, drum part-2 parameters, accent part-one parameter, 64 events 
 Pattern sequencer: 64 steps maximum per part; one parameter per part; 64 events per part; 256 patterns maximum per song; 35,700 events maximum

See also
 Roland TR-909
 Korg EA-1
 Korg Electribe series

References

External links

 http://www.vintagesynth.com/korg/etr.php
 http://www.planet-groove.com/korg/electribe_r.html
 Polynominal.com | Korg ER-1 review, info and demo clips

Drum machines
Electribe R